Minanapis is a genus of araneomorph spiders in the family Anapidae, first described by Norman I. Platnick & Raymond Robert Forster in 1989.

Species
 it contains five species:
Minanapis casablanca Platnick & Forster, 1989 – Chile
Minanapis floris Platnick & Forster, 1989 – Chile
Minanapis menglunensis Lin & Li, 2012 – China
Minanapis palena Platnick & Forster, 1989 – Chile, Argentina
Minanapis talinay Platnick & Forster, 1989 – Chile

References

Anapidae
Araneomorphae genera
Spiders of China
Spiders of South America
Taxa named by Raymond Robert Forster